Peamount United Football Club is an Irish association football club based in Newcastle, South Dublin. The club is best known for its senior women's team who in 2011–12 became founder members and inaugural champions of the Women's National League. They have also represented the Republic of Ireland in Europe and in 2011–12 they became the first Republic of Ireland team, including men's teams, to qualify from their group for the knockout stages of a European competition. The club's senior men's team compete in the Leinster Senior League. Peamount United have also fielded teams in the Dublin Women's Soccer League, the Dublin and District Schoolboys League and the Metropolitan Girls League.

History

2010 treble
Peamount United won a "treble" in 2010, winning the Dublin Women's Soccer League, the DWSL Premier Cup and the FAI Women's Cup. The 4–2 FAI Women's Cup final win over Salthill Devon, secured by Áine O'Gorman's hat-trick, was Peamount's first Cup success, following two previous final defeats in 2005 and 2008.

In August 2011, Louise Quinn scored a hat-trick against ŽNK Krka, as Peamount won 7–0 in the UEFA Women's Champions League qualifying round in Slovenia. Peamount's Champions League run ended with a last-32 elimination by Paris Saint-Germain Féminine in September and October 2011, 5–0 on aggregate.

WNL era
In November 2011, together with Shamrock Rovers, Castlebar Celtic, Cork Women's F.C., Raheny United and Wexford Youths, Peamount United were founder members of the Women's National League. Peamount United were also the inaugural 2011–12 league champions, finishing three points clear of second placed Raheny United. They completed a league double by also winning the WNL Cup, defeating Shamrock Rovers 1–0 in the final. Stephanie Roche 
was the league's top goalscorer with 26 goals. She also scored the winner in the WNL Cup final. Roche formed a strike partnership with Sara Lawlor who contributed 15 goals to Peamount United's league success. Lawlor was named Player of the Season at the inaugural end of season awards ceremony.

Peamount were beaten 2–1 by Raheny United in the 2012 FAI Women's Cup final. Raheny also beat Peamount to the 2012–13 league title by one point. Peamount's Sara Lawlor was the top goalscorer with 28 goals, and won a second consecutive Player of the Year award. Although Peamount won the WNL Cup final, 6–3 over Castlebar Celtic in May 2013, to retain the trophy.

In 2013–14, while playing for Peamount United against Wexford Youths, Roche also scored an acclaimed goal which went viral on YouTube. The match was not televised but footage of the goal was uploaded to the internet by team manager Eileen Gleeson. Later that year Roche, James Rodríguez and Robin van Persie were finalists for the 2014 FIFA Puskás Award, for the best goal of the year. At the 2014 FIFA Ballon d'Or awards ceremony on 12 January 2015, Roche finished in second place to Rodríguez. Roche finished as Top Goalscorer in 2013–14, and Julie-Ann Russell was named WNL Player of the Season, but Peamount were edged out by one point in another close title race with Raheny United.

When WNL rivals DLR Waves secured backing from University College Dublin and became UCD Waves in 2014, Peamount's manager Eileen Gleeson departed to take over at UCD Bowl, taking several Peamount players with her. Peamount regrouped with new manager James O'Callaghan placing a strong emphasis on youth development. Peamount finished second in 2017 with Amber Barrett Top Goalscorer and WNL Player of the Season. Ahead of 2018 some experienced players including Áine O'Gorman and Karen Duggan returned to Peamount from the Waves, who had lost the backing of UCD. Peamount finished third in 2018, and lost the 2018 FAI Women's Cup final 1–0 to Wexford Youths, but did collect their first trophy for five years in a 2–1 WNL Cup final win over Wexford.

In 2019 Peamount recaptured the League title for the first time since 2011–12. They lost their second successive FAI Women's Cup final to Wexford Youths, 3–2 this time. In the delayed and shortened 2020 season Peamount retained their WNL title with Áine O'Gorman as Top Goalscorer and Karen Duggan as Player of the Year. In the 2020 FAI Women's Cup Final Peamount thrashed Cork City 6–0 at Tallaght Stadium to secure a "double".

A dramatic conclusion to the 2021 season saw defending champions Peamount United unexpectedly squander a two-goal lead to lose 5–2 at home to Galway on the final match day, allowing Shelbourne to claim the title with their 3–2 win over Wexford Youths. Both matches were subject to live television coverage, following the WNL's agreement of a broadcast arrangement with TG4 in September 2021.

During the season a number of Peamount's players transferred to professional clubs in England and Scotland without the club receiving any compensation. Manager James O'Callaghan called for the formation of a task force, to examine the possibility of making the WNL semi-professional in future: "It's great for those players that they are getting to play professionally, but it's not great for the league to be losing them." Before the 2022 season "exploratory negotiations" on a merger with Shamrock Rovers failed.

Players

Current squad

Former players

WNL Top Goalscorer
  Stephanie Roche – 2011–12, 2013–14
  Sara Lawlor – 2012–13
  Amber Barrett – 2016, 2017

WNL Player of the Season
  Sara Lawlor – 2011–12, 2012–13   
  Julie-Ann Russell – 2013–14
  Amber Barrett – 2017

FIFA Puskás Award nominee
  Stephanie Roche – 2014

Others
 Ireland women's field hockey international
  Emily Beatty
  Katie Taylor – Irish, European, World and Olympic boxing champion
Scotland women's international
  Vaila Barsley

Peamount United in Europe

2011–12 UEFA Women's Champions League
After winning the 2010 FAI Women's Cup, Peamount United qualified for the 2011–12 UEFA Women's Champions League. They finished second in their group and, as the best runners-up, they qualified for the Round of 32. They were the first Republic of Ireland team, including men's team, to qualify for the knockout stages of a European competition.

Squad

Group 3

Round of 32

First leg

Second leg

2012–13 UEFA Women's Champions League 
After winning the inaugural 2011–12 Women's National League,
Peamount United qualified for the 2012–13 UEFA Women's Champions League.

Group 5

Honours

Women's team

 Women's National League
Winners: 2011–12, 2019 and 2020: 3
Runners-up: 2012–13, 2013–14, 2017 and 2021: 4
FAI Women's Cup
Winners: 2010: 1
Runners-up: 2005, 2008, 2018, 2019: 4
WNL Cup
Winners: 2012, 2013, 2018: 3
 Dublin Women's Soccer League
Winners: 2010: 1
Runners-up: 2005, 2006: 2
 DWSL Premier Cup
Winners: 2010: 1

References

 
Association football clubs established in 1983
Women's association football clubs in the Republic of Ireland
1983 establishments in Ireland
Leinster Senior League (association football) clubs
Women's National League (Ireland) teams
Dublin Women's Soccer League teams